Kovilje is a village in the municipality of Ivanjica, Serbia. According to the 2011 census, the village has a population of 18 inhabitants. It is situated between Mountains Golija and Javor in central Serbia.

The village is famous for the Orthodox Kovilje monastery founded in 12th century.

References

Populated places in Moravica District